Charles Cecil Martyn (1809 – 3 September 1866) was a British Conservative politician.

Martyn was elected Conservative Member of Parliament for Southampton at the 1841 general election, but lost the seat the next year when his election was declared void due to bribery by his agents.

His father was white, whilst his mother was a “woman of colour” from India.

References

External links
 

UK MPs 1841–1847
Conservative Party (UK) MPs for English constituencies
1809 births
1866 deaths
British politicians of Indian descent